Yamuna Vihar was a constituency of the Delhi Legislative Assembly in northern India. Yamuna Vihar constituency was a part of North East Delhi (Lok Sabha constituency).

The constituency was created pursuant to "Delimitation Order, 1967". Its first election was held in 1972 and it was assigned identification number 25. The constituency ceased to exist in 2008 after the "Delimitation of Parliamentary and Assembly Constituencies Order, 2008" was passed.

Members of Legislative Assembly

References

Former assembly constituencies of Delhi
North East Delhi district